Charmbracelet is the ninth studio album by American R&B singer Mariah Carey, released on December 3, 2002, through MonarC Entertainment and Island Records. The album was Carey's first release since her breakdown following the release of her film Glitter (2001) and its accompanying soundtrack album. Critics described Charmbracelet as one of Carey's most personal records, following 1997's Butterfly. Throughout the project, she collaborated with several musicians, including Jermaine Dupri, Jimmy Jam and Terry Lewis, 7 Aurelius and Dre & Vidal.

According to Carey, love is the album's main theme, and the songs combine introspective and personal themes with celebration and fun. The album contains a mixture of R&B beats, and the songs incorporate elements of other genres, such as gospel and soul. Compared to Glitter, which featured a variety of sampled melodies from the 1980s, Charmbracelet has a softer hip hop and R&B sound to it. Cam'ron, Jay-Z and Freeway also appear on the album.

Charmbracelet debuted at number three on the US Billboard 200 chart, and sold 241,000 copies in its first week. Internationally, the album reached the top-ten in Japan and Switzerland, and peaked inside the top-forty in seven other countries. Three singles were released to promote the album. The lead single, "Through the Rain" reached the top-ten in Canada, Switzerland, Sweden and Italy and the United Kingdom. In the US, it topped the Hot Dance Club Play chart, but stalled at number 81 on the Billboard Hot 100. Carey embarked on the Charmbracelet World Tour, and performed 69 shows in over eight months. She also performed on televised shows such as the 30th annual American Music Awards, Today, The View, the Soul Train Music Awards and The Oprah Winfrey Show. Internationally, she traveled to several countries to promote the record;  she made an appearance in Brazil, performing on the program Fantástico, in addition to several acoustic performances and interviews on MTV Europe and MTV UK.

Background 

Before the release of Charmbracelet, Carey experienced a year of critical, commercial and personal struggles, following the poor reception of her debut film Glitter (2001) and its accompanying soundtrack, as well as her subsequent hospitalization. After divorcing her husband, Tommy Mottola, Carey released Butterfly (1997). With her next release, Rainbow (1999), Carey incorporated elements of R&B and hip hop into her music, particularly on the lead single "Heartbreaker". According to The Sacramento Bee, she attempted to sound more "ghetto". She stopped working with longtime pop producers such as Babyface and Walter Afanasieff, in order to pursue a new sound and audience, and worked with writers Sean Combs and Jermaine Dupri. Following the worldwide success of  Rainbow, Carey left Columbia Records. Controversially, Mottola and executive Benny Medina in 1999 used several songs Carey had written and co-written for Jennifer Lopez. Carey's 2001 film debut Glitter was panned by movie critics, and earned less than eight million dollars at the box office.

Carey's $100 million recording contract was bought out by Virgin Records for $28 million. Carey checked into a hospital in Connecticut, following a controversial appearance on Total Request Live, in which she gave ice cream to fans, left troubling messages on her website and demonstrated what was considered by the media as "erratic behavior". Carey said she had an "emotional and physical breakdown." After a fortnight's hospitalization, Carey flew to Capri, Italy, where she stayed for five months and began writing and producing material for a new studio album about her recent troubles. She was signed by Island Records, and started her own imprint, MonarC Entertainment, for her intended "comeback" release, Charmbracelet.

Development and recording 

Carey started writing songs for the album in early 2002, before she signed the record deal. She decided to rest, traveled to Capri and moved into a recording studio where she could focus on writing and recording without distractions. Most of the album was recorded in Capri, although she traveled to Atlanta, New York and Philadelphia to record some tracks. That year, Carey claimed Charmbracelet to be the "most personal album" she had ever made. She worked with longtime collaborators Jermaine Dupri, Jimmy Jam and Terry Lewis and Randy Jackson and other songwriters and producers 7 Aurelius, Just Blaze, Damizza and Dre & Vidal. The opening track and the first track to be written for the album, "Through the Rain", was written by Carey and Lionel Cole, was inspired Carey's recent experiences, and was co-produced by Jam and Lewis. It was released as the lead single from the album.

Jam, Lewis and Carey also worked "Yours", which Jam said contains "probably one of the best hooks [ever]", and likened it to one of trio's previous collaborations, "Thank God I Found You" (2000). Initially, the song was recorded as duet with pop singer Justin Timberlake. However, due to contractual complications, it was never released and a solo version was featured on the album. Jam and Lewis produced two more songs, "Wedding Song" and "Satisfy"the latter featuring background vocals from Michael Jacksonwhich were not released on the album.

Carey decided to work with Just Blaze after she heard the song "Oh Boy", which he produced for Cam'ron. Just Blaze and Carey  produced "Boy (I Need You)", a remake of "Oh Boy", and "You Got Me". Carey said "Boy (I Need You)" was one of her favorites on the album. "You Got Me" features rap verses from Jay-Z and Freeway, was noted by Carey as a "signature Just Blaze track". Jay-Z was in Capri on  vacation, and went to the studio to hear the song and said that he wanted to contribute to it and added rap verses of his own. Dupri produced "The One" and "You Had Your Chance". He said that they wanted to stick to the "same familiar sound" from his previous collaborations with Carey. Carey said "The One" was a personal song, which was about being hurt in past relationships and the uncertainty about forming new ones. Carey decided to experiment with a live band for the album. In April 2002, she met 7 Aurelius and asked him to produce songs for the album. They flew to Nassau, Bahamas and recorded a mixture of mid-tempo and up-tempo tracks and ballads with a live band. 7 Aurelius said that Carey was "an amazing writer" and described the process of recording:

We did three or four songs in three or four days. The way we was doing it, I had [a horn section] down there along with me. We had the whole room set up with candles, some nice wine[it was] a very good vibe. It was completely stripped down, like 'Mariah Carey Unplugged'. She stripped herself down to her talent. She was really trusting of me and my vision, and I was trusting of who she was.

Randy Jackson contributed to four tracks on the album, and said it was "the most real and honest record she's made. She didn't care what anyone thought of the lyrics. They were only important to her." Carey included a cover of  Def Leppard's song "Bringin' On the Heartbreak". During the photo shoot for Charmbracelet at Capri, Carey happened to listen to Def Leppard's greatest hits album Vault (1995), which contains the song, and decided to cover it. In an interview with Billboard, Carey said that the song is "an example of her musical diversity". Jackson also worked on "My Saving Grace", which Carey said describes her thoughts about the writing, recording and mastering process. While working in Capri, Carey's father became ill with cancer and she returned to New York to spend some time with him; he died soon after. In his memory, Carey wrote and produced the song "Sunflowers for Alfred Roy". Carey said that the song represents "his side of the family and is kind of hard to talk about." The song proved to be "very emotional" for Carey, and she sang it only once in the studio. DJ Quik also produced songs for the album, but none of them were included.

Music and lyrics 

Carey attempted to make a musical comeback with Charmbracelet, which focused on bringing Carey back to her R&B and soul roots in an attempt to recapture her audience. Critics both praised and criticized the condition of Carey's voice on the album; many called the songs average, and felt that most lacked sufficient hooks. The album's lead single, and Carey's boldest attempt at recreating the ballads from the early years of her career, was "Through the Rain", which was produced by Carey, and was described by one critic as "the sort of self-help ballad Ms. Carey was singing a decade ago". The songs on the album are a mixture of several genres.

Carey's cover of "Bringin' On the Heartbreak", was recorded using live instrumentation, and was the album's third single. It begins as a "piano-driven slow jam", which is followed by a "dramatic chord progression" after the second chorus, and Carey's "precise and fluttery voice reaches incredible heights" as it "turns the power ballad into something more delicate." Kelefa Sanneh from The New York Times called "Yours""a delectable combination of breathy vocals and playful rhythms." Barry Walters from Rolling Stone wrote that on "Yours", "Carey's lead vocals blend into choruses of overdubbed Mariah's cooing overlapping phrases. Circling these are choirs of more Mariahs singing harmonies and countermelodies. Topping it off are generous sprinklings of the singer's patented birdcalls, wails, sighs and whispers."

Critics considered "Subtle Invitation" to be one of the album's strongest songs because of its "well executed" jazz influence. The song begins with the sounds of people dining, then introduces the strong bassline and drums. Towards the end of the song, Carey belts out the climax. Sarah Rodman from The Boston Herald described it as fascinating and wrote, "it sounds as though Carey is singing in falsetto while still in her chest voice." "Clown" drew strong media attention, and its lyrical content led critics to speculate that Carey aimed it at rapper Eminem, who had publicly announced that he had had a relationship with Carey. Rodman said "Clown" was "languidly sinister", with lyrics such as, "I should've left it at 'I like your music too' ... You should never have intimated we were lovers / when you know very well we never even touched each other." Critics compared "I Only Wanted" with "My All"'s instrumentation and structure of verse, chorus and guitar solo. According to Sal Cinquemani from Slant Magazine, Carey makes vague allusions to her ex-husband Tommy Mottola with the line, "Wish I'd stayed beneath my veil". The song uses Latin-inspired guitar instrumentation and wind sounds as an additional backbone to the melody, and dripping water as its percussion.

"Sunflowers for Alfred Roy", one of the album's most personal songs, is named after Carey's father; she makes direct reference to him and a moment they shared at his death bed. The song is backed with a simple piano accompaniment, and Carey recounts a visit with her father in his hospital room: "Strange to feel that proud, strong man / Grip tightly to my hand."

Singles 

Three singles were released from the album. The lead single, "Through the Rain" was released on September 24, 2002. It received mixed reviews from critics, some of whom said it was too similar to her earlier ballads, such as "Hero" and "Outside", while others praised Carey's vocals in the song. It was one of Carey's poorest-selling US singles, reaching number 81 on the US Billboard Hot 100 chart. However, it topped the Hot Dance Club Play charts and reached the top twenty of the Adult Contemporary chart. Outside the US, the single performed moderately, peaking within the top ten in Canada, Switzerland, Sweden, Italy and the UK, and within the top 20 in Ireland, Australia, Norway and Denmark. The music video of "Through the Rain", directed by Dave Meyers, is based on the courtship and eloping of Carey's parents. Scenes of Carey singing in a street when rain starts to fall are juxtaposed with the story of a mixed-race couple who run away from their families, who oppose their relationship.

"Boy (I Need You)", which was released as the second single on November 26, 2002, received mixed reviews from critics. The single failed to make much impact on charts worldwide; it reached number 68 on the US Billboard Hip-Hop/R&B Songs chart and number 57 on the US Hot Singles Sales chart. Elsewhere, the song reached number 17 in the UK, and peaked within the top 40 in Australia, the Netherlands, Ireland and New Zealand. The music video for "Boy (I Need You)" was directed by Joseph Kahn and was filmed at Shibuya and Los Angeles. Initially, "The One" was scheduled to be released as the second single and the music video was shot for that song. However, halfway through the filming, the single was changed to "Boy (I Need You)". Described as "Speed Racer meets Hello Kitty meets me and Cam'ron" by Carey, the video incorporates elements of Japanese culture and features Carey's alter-ego Bianca.

The third single from the album was Carey's cover version of "Bringin' On the Heartbreak", released on November 25, 2003. Though it gained mostly positive reviews, it failed to chart on the Billboard Hot 100, but reached number five on the Hot Dance Club Play chart. Outside the US, the song saw its highest peak in Switzerland, reaching number 28 and staying on the charts for eight weeks. It also charted in Austria and the Wallonia region of Belgium. The music video for the song was directed by Sanaa Hamri. Another cut from the album, "Irresistible (Westside Connection)" charted at number 81 on the US Billboard Hip-Hop/R&B Songs.

Promotion 

Following the release of "Through the Rain", Carey embarked on several US and international promotional tours in support of Charmbracelet and its accompanying singles. Promotion for "Through the Rain" began at the 2002 NRJ Awards, where Carey performed wearing a long black skirt and denim blazer. Three days before the album's US release, a one-hour program titled Mariah Carey: Shining Through the Rain, in which Carey was interviewed and sang several songs from Charmbracelet and her back catalog, aired on MTV. Carey addressed rumors of her breakdown and its cause, and spoke about the album and its inspiration, and conducted a question and answer session with fans. During the first month after the album's release, Carey appeared on several television talk shows. She launched her promotional tour on Today, where she performed four songs at Mall of America for a crowd of over 10,000. On December 2, Carey traveled to Brazil for South American promotion of Charmbracelet, appearing on the popular television program Fantástico. She sang "My All", and performed "Through the Rain" and "I Only Wanted" wearing a long pink gown. She also made a surprise appearance on Show da Virada, singing "Through the Rain" and "My All", while wearing a short silver dress. On December 3, 2002, Carey appeared on The Oprah Winfrey Show, where she performed "Through the Rain" and "My Saving Grace", and gave a highly publicized interview about her hospitalization. Before her breakdown, Carey had been booked for a private interview with ABC's Barbara Walters, executive producer of The View, following Glitters release. Instead of giving Walters the full-coverage interview following Carey's return to the public eye, Island decided Oprah was more appropriate, and changed the appearance. Carey's interview with Matt Lauer on Dateline NBC aired the same evening.

On December 17, Carey performed "I Only Wanted" on The View after guest co-hosting the program. One month later, Carey was one of the headlining performers at the 30th annual American Music Awards, held on January 13, 2003. She performed "Through the Rain" alongside a live gospel choir, and wore a long black evening gown. During the performance, images of newspaper headlines reporting Carey's breakdown were projected on a large curtain behind her, with one reading, "When you fall down, you get back up." Carey received a standing ovation. In mid-February, Carey was the headline performer at the NBA all-star game, which was Michael Jordan's last game. She wore a long, purple, skin-tight Washington Wizards' dress, and performed "Boy (I Need You)", "My Saving Grace" and "Hero", which received a standing ovation and brought Jordan to tears. On March 1, 2003, Carey performed at the Soul Train Music Awards, sporting a retro-curled hairstyle and wearing a burgundy evening gown. She performed "My Saving Grace", and as at the American Music Awards, images of newspaper headlines and inspirational photographs were projected onto a large screen. Following the performance, Carey was awarded a lifetime achievement award for her contribution to music. Towards the end of March, Charmbracelet was released in Europe and Carey appeared on several television programs to promote the album. She performed the album's leading two singles on the British music chart show, Top of the Pops, and a similar set on The Graham Norton Show and Fame Academy. On the latter program, Carey was joined on stage by the show's finalists, who sang the climax on "Through the Rain" alongside her.

Tour 

To promote the album, Carey announced a world tour in April 2003. , "Charmbracelet World Tour: An Intimate Evening with Mariah Carey" was her most extensive tour, lasting over eight months and performing sixty-nine shows in venues worldwide. Before tickets went on sale in the US, venues were switched from large arenas to smaller, more intimate theater shows. According to Carey, the change was made in order to give fans a more intimate show, and something more Broadway-influenced. She said, "It's much more intimate so you'll feel like you had an experience. You experience a night with me." However, while smaller productions were booked for the US leg of the tour, Carey performed at stadia and arenas in Asia and Europe, and performed for a crowd of over 35,000 in Manila, 50,000 in Malaysia, and to over 70,000 people in China. In the UK, it was Carey's first tour to feature shows outside London; she performed in Glasgow, Birmingham and Manchester.

"Charmbracelet World Tour: An Intimate Evening with Mariah Carey" garnered generally positive reviews from music critics and audiences, many of whom complimented the quality of Carey's live vocals and the production of the shows. Fans were given the opportunity to request songs from Carey's catalog, which added to its positive reception. At her concert in Manila, Rito P. Asilo from Philippine Daily Inquirer wrote, "I didn't expect her voice to be that crystal clear!" He added, "After 15 songs, we couldn't seem to get enough of Mariahand we became a believer!".

Critical reception 

Upon its release, Charmbracelet was released to mostly negative critical reception. Aggregator website Metacritic, which averages professional reviews into a numerical score, gave Charmbracelet a score of 43/100, indicating "mixed or average reviews". Stephen Thomas Erlewine from AllMusic rated the album two and the half out of five stars, and criticized its production and the condition of Carey's voice. He wrote, "Whenever she sings, there's a raspy whistle behind her thin voice and she strains to make notes throughout the record ... Her voice is damaged, and there's not a moment where it sounds strong or inviting." Tom Sinclair of  Entertainment Weekly said she was "in fine voice". He wrote that "Through the Rain" sinks in its own sodden sentimentality, as do by-the-numbers efforts like 'Yours' and 'I Only Wanted'", and added that "Clown' is a moody number graced with mournful acoustic guitar and a gorgeously nuanced vocal, while 'Sunflowers for Alfred Roy' is a short, sweet song sung to a lovely piano accompaniment". He finished by saying that "too much of Charmbracelet is mired in middle-of-the-road muck."

Billboard editor Michael Paoletta praised Carey's return to her core audience. He said that although Carey might have alienated her hip hop followers from her previous three albums, her older fans from the 1990s would be more receptive to the material and her new image. Kelefa Sanneh from The New York Times wrote that the album "is generally pleasant, although it's not always exciting, and a few of the collaborations go awry". He called Carey's voice "invariably astonishing", and said that "she can hit high notes that barely sound human", praised her versatility, and wrote that she "also knows how to make a hip-hop hit by holding back and letting the beat shine." Ethan Browne of New York slated the album's whimsical chimes and tinkling keyboards, and wrote, "Was Charmbracelet recorded in a Casio shop? This instrument needs to be stopped."

Rating Charmbracelet two out of five stars, Barry Walters from Rolling Stone wrote that none of the songs were bold, that the lack of hooks made the album weak, and said, "Carey needs bold songs that help her use the power and range for which she is famous. Charmbracelet is like a stream of watercolors that bleed into a puddle of brown." Sal Cinquemani from Slant Magazine complimented Carey's mixture of pop and hip hop melodies, and wrote, "Though there's nothing as immediate as 'Fantasy' or 'My All' here, Charmbracelet is significantly less contrived than 1999's Rainbow and almost as creatively liberating as Butterfly. British columnist Angus Batey, writing for Yahoo! Music UK called the songs on Charmbracelet forgettable, and wrote, "She used to take risks, but Charmbracelet is conservative, unadventurous and uninspiring; and, while it's understandable that simply to make another record marks a triumph of sorts, it's impossible to admire Mariah to the degree that her talent ought to merit." John Mulvey from NME criticized its content, writing, "Nominally, Charmbracelet is R&B, much like Tony Blair is nominally a socialist ... Tragedies, all told, have been worse"

At the 17th Japan Gold Disc Award in 2003, the album was nominated in the category of Rock and Pop Album of the Year (International).

Commercial performance 

Charmbracelet was initially slated for release in the US on December 10, 2002. However, the date was revised to December 3, 2002. It was released through Island Records and Carey's label MonarC Entertainment. A highly anticipated release, it debuted at number three on the US Billboard 200, with first-week sales of 241,000 units, more than the first-week sales of the critically panned Glitter soundtrack, but fewer than 1999's Rainbow, which sold 323,000 units in its first week. Next week, the album fell to number fourteen, despite selling a further 173,000 units. It stayed on the chart for 22 weeks. Charmbracelet was certified Platinum by the Recording Industry Association of America (RIAA) for shipments of one million units in the US. , the estimated sales of the album in the US (compiled by Nielsen Soundscan) were 1,166,000 copies which was a slight improvement over the sales of Glitter.

In Canada, the album debuted and peaked on the Canadian Albums Chart at number 30. This placement was a decline in contrast to Glitter, which debuted at number four on the chart. It was certified Gold by the Canadian Recording Industry Association (CRIA) for shipments of 50,000 copies. On the week dated December 15, 2002, Chamrbracelet entered the Australian Albums Chart at its peak position of number 42. It exited the chart the next week, becoming one of Carey's lowest charting albums in the country. In Japan, Charmbracelet debuted at number four on the Oricon Albums Chart, its second-highest peak worldwide, and sold 63,365 units in its first week. The album spent another week at number four, and sold 71,206 units. It stayed on the charts for a total of 15 weeks and according to Oricon, has sold 240,440 copies. The Recording Industry Association of Japan (RIAJ) certified Charmbracelet platinum for shipments of 200,000 copies.

In Austria, the album peaked at number 34 and stayed on the charts for seven weeks. In the Flemish region of Belgium it charted and peaked at number 48 and reached number 28 in the Walloon region of that country. Charmbracelet entered the French Albums Chart at number 20 in the week dated December 7, 2002, spent 30 weeks on the chart and was certified Gold by the Syndicat National de l'Édition Phonographique (SNEP), denoting shipments of 100,000 units. Charmbracelet charted and peaked at number 32 in Germany It reached number 50 in Sweden. In Switzerland, the album peaked at number nine on the Swiss Albums Chart and stayed on the charts for 10 weeks; it was certified Gold by the International Federation of the Phonographic Industry (IFPI). In the United Kingdom, the album peaked at number 52, selling 19,000 copies in its first week. It has sold a total of 122,010 copies as of April 2008. In February 2003, it was certified Gold by the British Phonographic Industry (BPI) for shipments of 100,000 copies in the UK. In the Netherlands, the album debuted at number 48, the issue dated December 14, 2002. The following week, it peaked at number 30. It stayed on the charts for 19 weeks, and made two re-entries, one in June 2003 and other in August 2003.

Charmbracelet was certified Gold in both Brazil and Hong Kong by Associação Brasileira dos Produtores de Discos (ABPD) and IFPI Hong Kong respectively. The album has sold an estimated three million copies worldwide.

Re-release 
While preparing for the Asian leg of the Charmbracelet World Tour, Carey announced that Charmbraclet would be re-released with four additional tracks in Europe and Asia on July 26, 2003 – the first day of the North American leg of the tour.  Carey included her duet with Busta Rhymes, "I Know What You Want", which was released as a single from his album, It Ain't Safe No More (2002), and became Carey's highest-charting song internationally in 2003, reaching top five peaks in Australia, Canada, the Netherlands, Ireland, Italy, Switzerland, the US and the UK. In an interview with Carson Daly, Carey said, "The Busta Rhymes duet ... has become so successful and we always said I would put it on my album as well." The re-release also included "There Goes My Heart", "Got a Thing 4 You" featuring Da Brat and Elephant Man, and "The One (So So Def Remix)" featuring Bone Crusher. The re-released version of the album charted for three weeks on the Oricon album chart in Japan, where it peaked at number 96 on the issue dated July 14, 2003.

Track listing 

Notes
 "Boy (I Need You)" contains samples of "Oh Boy" by Cam'ron and "Call Me" by Tweet.
 "You Had Your Chance" contains a sample of "I Want'a Do Something Freaky to You" by  Leon Haywood.
 "Irresistible (Westside Connection)" contains a sample of "You Know How We Do It" by Ice Cube.
 "Bringin' On the Heartbreak" is a cover of "Bringin' On the Heartbreak" by Def Leppard.

Personnel 
Credits for Charmbracelet taken from the album's liner notes.

 Mariah Carey – producer, executive producer, vocals, background vocals
 Asif Ali – engineer
 Florian Ammon – digital editing, audio mixing, vocal engineer
 Giulio Antognini – assistant engineer
 Bobby Ross Avila – guitar
 Rob Bacon – guitar, electric guitar
 Karen Elaine Bakunin – viola
 Charlie Bisharat – String Quartet, strings
 Printz Board – trumpet
 Oswald "Wiz" Bowe – assistant engineer
 Denyse Buffum – viola
 Eve Butler – string quartet, strings
 Cam'ron – rap
 David Campbell – string arrangements
 Darius Campo – string quartet, strings
 Shawn Carter – featured artist
 Dana Jon Chappelle – engineer, vocal engineer
 Susan Chatman – string quartet, strings
 Andrew Chavez – assistant engineer
 Lionel Cole – piano, synthesizer bass
 Larry Corbett – cello
 Bryan-Michael Cox – producer
 Kenneth Crouch – bass, Fender Rhodes, keyboard
 Damizza – producer
 Melonie Daniels – background vocals
 Vidal Davis – mixing
 Mario Diaz de Leon – string quartet, strings
 Joel Derouin – string quartet, strings
 Vincent Dilorenzo – assistant engineer
 DJ Vice – programming
 Karen Dreyfus – viola
 Jermaine Dupri – mixing, producer
 Elizabeth Dyson – cello
 Brian Frye – engineer
 Matt Funes – viola
 Kevin G. – engineer
 Armen Garabedian – string quartet, strings
 Paul Gregory – assistant engineer, engineer
 Kevin Guarnieri – digital editing, engineer
 Matt Gunes – viola
 Mick Guzauski – mixing
 Reggie Hamilton – bass
 Dawn Hannay – viola
 Andre Harris – mixing
 David Ryan Harris – guitar
 Steve Hodge – engineer, mixing
 John Horesco IV – assistant
 Randy Jackson – bass, bass guitar, percussion, producer
 Jimmy Jam – guitar, instrumentation, producer
 Eric Johnson – acoustic guitar
 Just Blaze – instrumentation, producer
 Suzie Katayama – cello, string contractor
 Gimel "Young Guru" Katon – mixing
 Steve Kempster – string mixing, track engineer
 Peter Kent – string quartet, strings
 Kevin G. – engineer
 Ann Kim – violin
 Lisa Kim – violin
 Myung Hi Kim – violin
 Melissa Kleinbart – violin
 Soohyun Kwon – violin
 Trevor Lawrence – drum programming
 Jeanne LeBlanc – cello
 John Lemkuhi – percussion, Sound design
 Ken Lewis – mixing
 Terry Lewis – guitar, instrumentation, producer
 Liza Lim – violin
 Trey Lorenz – background vocals
 Bob Ludwig – mastering
 Mario Deleon – strings
 Rob Mathes – conductor, string arrangements
 Jeremy McCoy – bass
 Melanie Daniels – background vocals
 Colin Miller – engineer
 Ann Mincieli – assistant engineer
 Tadd Mingo – assistant engineer
 John D. Mitchell – drum programming
 Bill Molina – engineer
 Billy Odum – guitar
 William Odum – guitar
 Tim Olmstead – assistant engineer
 Suzanne Ornstein – violin
 Alyssa Park – string quartet, strings
 Sara Parkins – string quartet, strings
 John Patitucci – bass
 Kelly Price – singing, background vocals
 Michelle Richards – string quartet, strings
 Steve Richards – cello, strings
 Alexander Richbourg – drum programming, vocal programming
 Robert Rinehart – viola
 Tom Rosenthal – viola
 Jeff Rothschild – assistant engineer
 Laura Seaton – violin
 7 Aurelius – producer, programming
 Andrew Sherman – piano
 Jaime Sickora – assistant engineer
 Dexter Simmons – mixing
 Fiona Simon – violin
 Carl "Butch" Small – percussion
 John Smeltz – engineer, mixing
 Dan Smith – cello, strings
 Daniel Smith – cello
 Xavier Smith – assistant, assistant engineer
 Jay Spears – assistant engineer, digital editing
 Brian Springer – engineer
 Brian Sumner – assistant engineer
 Phil Tan – engineer, mixing
 Mary Ann Tatum – background vocals
 Lesa Terry – string quartet, strings
 Michael Thompson – guitar, classical guitar, steel guitar
 Jeremy Turner – cello
 German Villacorta – assistant engineer
 Seth Waldman – assistant engineer
 Evan Wilson – viola
 John Wittenberg – string quartet, strings
 Mary Wooten – cello
 Jason Wormer – assistant engineer
 James "Big Jim" Wright – producer
 Sharon Yamada – violin
 Jung Sun Yoo – violin
 Bradley Yost – assistant engineer
 Antony Zeller – assistant engineer

Charts

Weekly charts

Monthly charts

Year-end charts

Certifications and sales

References

Works cited 
 

2002 albums
Mariah Carey albums
Island Records albums
Albums produced by Bryan-Michael Cox
Albums produced by Dre & Vidal
Albums produced by Jermaine Dupri
Albums produced by Jimmy Jam and Terry Lewis
Albums produced by Just Blaze
Albums recorded at Westlake Recording Studios
Albums recorded at Henson Recording Studios